The Central and Eastern European Software Engineering Conference in Russia (CEE-SECR) is a software engineering event for IT and software specialists from Central and Eastern Europe. It was established in 2005.

The conference program is composed of research presentations, panel discussions, keynote lectures, experience reports, and training workshops.

Working languages are dual English and Russian.

Conference Program Committee includes highly recognized international and domestic software engineering experts from both industry and academia.

The list of speakers from previous CEE-SECRs includes: Thomas Erl, Bjarne Stroustrup, Erich Gamma, Richard Soley, Igor Agamirzian, Grady Booch, Lars Bak, Alexander L. Wolf, Yuri Gurevich, Victor Ivannikov, Stephen Mellor, Larry Constantine, Ivar Jacobson, Rick Kazman, and Michael Cusumano.

CEE-SECR is targeted to software professionals such as software architects, project managers, process engineers, software engineering process group directors, business analysts, team leaders, IT managers, CIOs/CTOs, QA managers, and senior developers.

External links
Official website

2005 establishments in Russia
Recurring events established in 2005
Software engineering conferences